The Coldwater River is a river in the Unorganized North Part of Algoma District in Northeastern Ontario, Canada. It is in the Great Lakes Basin, is a tributary of Lake Superior, and its entire course lies within Lake Superior Provincial Park.

Course
The Coldwater River begins at Black Lake, in geographic Barager Township, and travels south through geographic Broome Township, and the southeast corner of geographic Brimbacombe Township before flowing into geographic Giles Township, where it takes in the right tributary June Creek, passes under Ontario Highway 17, and reaches its mouth at Lake Superior.

Tributaries
June Creek

See also
List of rivers of Ontario

References 

Rivers of Algoma District
Tributaries of Lake Superior